The 1992–93 season of the Moroccan Throne Cup was the 37th edition of the competition.

Kawkab Marrakech won the cup, beating Maghreb de Fès 1–0 in the final, played at the Prince Moulay Abdellah Stadium in Rabat. Kawkab Marrakech won the competition for the sixth time in their history.

Competition

Last 16

Quarter finals

Semi-finals

Final 
The final took place between the two winning semi-finalists, Kawkab Marrakech and KAC Kénitra, on 16 December 1993 at the Prince Moulay Abdellah Stadium in Rabat.

Notes and references 

1992
1992 in association football
1993 in association football
1992–93 in Moroccan football